AhangarKela (AhangarKala; , also Romanized as Āhangar Kolā and Āhangar Kalā; also known as Āhangar Kolā-ye Bīsheh Sar) is a village in Aliabad Rural District, in the Central District of Qaem Shahr County, Mazandaran Province, Iran. At the 2006 census, its population was 1,554, in 432 families.

References 

Populated places in Qaem Shahr County